The 1992 California Golden Bears football team was an American football team that represented the University of California, Berkeley in the Pacific-10 Conference (Pac-10) during the 1992 NCAA Division I-A football season. In their first year under head coach Keith Gilbertson, the Golden Bears compiled a 4–7 record (2–6 against Pac-10 opponents), finished in ninth place in the Pac-10, scored 284 points, and allowed 284 points.

The team's statistical leaders included Dave Barr with 2,343 passing yards, Russell White with 1,069 rushing yards, and Sean Dawkins with 1,070 receiving yards.

Schedule

Roster

References

California
California Golden Bears football seasons
California Golden Bears football